Albanian Supercup 1989 is the first edition of the Albanian Supercup since its establishment in 1989. The match was contested between the 1988–89 Albanian Cup winners Dinamo Tirana and the 1988–89 Albanian Superliga champions 17 Nëntori.

Match details

See also
 1988–89 Albanian Superliga
 1988–89 Albanian Cup

References

1989
Supercup
Albanian Supercup, 1989
Albanian Supercup, 1989